The 47th Assembly District of Wisconsin is one of 99 districts in the Wisconsin State Assembly.  Located in south-central Wisconsin, the district comprises municipalities in south-central Dane County, including the city of Monona, the village of McFarland, and the northern half of the city of Fitchburg.  It also contains the Capital Springs State Recreation Area, the Pflaum-McWilliams Mound Group, and the Alliant Energy Center.  The seat is represented by Democrat Jimmy P. Anderson since January 2017.

The 47th Assembly district is located within Wisconsin's 16th Senate district, along with the 46th and 48th Assembly districts.

History
The district was created in the 1972 redistricting act (1971 Wisc. Act 304) which first established the numbered district system, replacing the previous system which allocated districts to specific counties.  The 47th district was drawn with novel boundaries, taking part of the former Dane County 5th district and part of the Rock County 2nd district.  The last representative of the Rock County 2nd district, Janet Soergel Mielke, won the 1972 election to become the 1st representative of the 47th Assembly district.

The boundaries of the 47th district have changed significantly in almost every one of the redistrictings since 1982.  The court-ordered 1982 redistricting placed the district in northern Wisconsin. The 1983 legislative redistricting, which superseded the court-ordered plan, brought the district back to southern Wisconsin, covering most of Green County, sprawling through western and northern Rock County into southwest Jefferson County.  The 1992 and 2002 maps had the district based in Columbia County and parts of northern Dane County.  The 2011 plan moved the district into central Dane County.

In its current boundaries, the 47th district is one of several districts which violates the Wisconsin Constitution's requirement for districts to "consist of contiguous territory."  The district has several isolated territorial islands, due to the inclusion of the towns of Madison and Blooming Grove, but not the wards of city of Madison which would be needed to connect the various pieces of the towns.

List of past representatives

References 

Wisconsin State Assembly districts
Dane County, Wisconsin